Kassian (Otto) Lauterer (29 January 1934 – 19 October 2022) was an Austrian Roman Catholic priest.

Lauterer was born in Austria and was ordained to the priesthood for the Cistercian order in 1957. He served as the abbot of the Territorial Abbey of Wettingen-Mehrerau from 1968 until his retirement in 2009.

He died in Bregenz on 19 October 2022, at the age of 88.

References

1931 births
2022 deaths
Austrian Cistercians
Cistercian abbots
People from Bregenz